The 2009 Juan Martín del Potro tennis season officially began at the Auckland Open, where he had won his first title at Auckland.

All matches

Singles matches

Yearly records

Head-to-head matchups
Juan Martín del Potro had a  match win–loss record in the 2009 season. Bold indicates player was ranked top 10 at time of meeting. The following list is ordered by number of wins:

 Viktor Troicki 3–0
 Igor Andreev 2–0
 Tomáš Berdych 2–0
 Marin Čilić 2–0
 Fernando González 2–0
 Ernests Gulbis 2–0
 Andy Roddick 2–0
 Robin Söderling 2–0
 Stan Wawrinka 2–0
 Jürgen Melzer 2–1
 Martín Vassallo Argüello 1–0
 Guillermo Cañas 1–0
 Arnaud Clément 1–0
 David Ferrer 1–0
 Juan Carlos Ferrero 1–0
 Victor Hănescu 1–0
 Jan Hernych 1–0
 Lu Yen-Hsun 1–0
 John Isner 1–0
 Daniel Köllerer 1–0
 Michaël Llodra 1–0
 Florian Mayer 1–0
 Ivo Minář 1–0
 Juan Mónaco 1–0
 Gilles Müller 1–0
 Kei Nishikori 1–0
 Sam Querrey 1–0
 Tommy Robredo 1–0
 Marat Safin 1–0
 Andreas Seppi 1–0 
 Andrea Stoppini 1–0
 Ryan Sweeting 1–0
 Janko Tipsarević 1–0
 Jo-Wilfried Tsonga 1–0
 Fernando Verdasco 1–0
 Mischa Zverev 1–0
 Rafael Nadal 3–1
 Roger Federer 2–3
 Andy Murray 1–3
 Lleyton Hewitt 1–1
 Ivan Ljubičić 0–1
 Nikolay Davydenko 0–1
 Novak Djokovic 0–1
 Édouard Roger-Vasselin 0–1
 Mardy Fish 0–1
 Radek Štěpánek 0–2

See also
 2009 ATP World Tour
 2009 Roger Federer tennis season
 2009 Rafael Nadal tennis season
 2009 Novak Djokovic tennis season

References

External links 
 ATP tour profile

Potro, Juan Martin del
2009 in Argentine tennis
2009 in Argentine sport